is a railway station on the Hanawa Line in the city of  Hachimantai, Iwate Prefecture, Japan, operated by East Japan Railway Company (JR East).

Lines

Station layout
The station has one side platform and one island platform serving three tracks, connected to the station building by a level crossing. The station has a Midori-no-madoguchi staffed ticket office.

Platforms

History
Arayashimmachi Station opened on October 30, 1927, serving the village of Arasawa. The station was absorbed into the JR East network upon the privatization of JNR on April 1, 1987.

Passenger statistics
In fiscal 2015, the station was used by an average of 60 passengers daily (boarding passengers only).

Surrounding area
former Ashiro village hall
Hachimantai City Museum
Arai Post Office

See also
 List of Railway Stations in Japan

References

External links

  

Hanawa Line
Railway stations in Japan opened in 1927
Railway stations in Iwate Prefecture
Stations of East Japan Railway Company
Hachimantai, Iwate